WGVU-TV, virtual channel 35 (VHF digital channel 11), is a Public Broadcasting Service (PBS) member television station licensed to Grand Rapids, Michigan, United States. It operates a full-time satellite station, WGVK (virtual channel 52, VHF digital channel 5) in Kalamazoo. The two stations are owned by Grand Valley State University, and maintain studios in the Meijer Public Broadcast Center, located in the Eberhard Center on the GVSU Pew Campus in downtown Grand Rapids. WGVU's transmitter is located near the GVSU main campus in Allendale, while WGVK's transmitter is based in Kalamazoo's Westwood neighborhood.

History
The station signed on the air on December 17, 1972, as WGVC, owned by what was then Grand Valley State College. Channel 35 originally operated from the basement of Manitou Hall on GVSC's Allendale campus.

WGVC's signal was somewhat marginal in the southern portion of the vast West Michigan market (Kalamazoo and Battle Creek). It must conform its signal to protect fellow PBS member WNIT in South Bend, Indiana, on adjacent channel 34. In much of this area, WGVC could only be seen on cable. This was very similar to what the area's main ABC affiliate, WZZM-TV (channel 13), faced due to the presence of WTVG in Toledo, Ohio. To make up for this shortfall in coverage, Grand Valley State signed on WGVK as a satellite station in 1984. In 1986, the station relocated to its current studio facility at the Meijer Public Broadcast Center. The station's callsign was changed to WGVU-TV in 1987, when Grand Valley State was elevated to university status.

Programming
WGVU produces numerous local programs. It also carries national shows from PBS, American Public Television, and the National Educational Telecommunications Association. NPR and PRI programming heard on WGVU-FM is aired on the fifth digital subchannel's SAP channel.

Weekly
 Ask The... – a live call-in show about a specific topic, hosted by Shelley Irwin; it airs Thursdays at 6:00 p.m.
 Grand Valley State Sports Report (formerly GV Sports) – hosted by WZZM-TV sports anchor Brent Ashcroft, this program covers Grand Valley State University athletics. During the athletic season, it airs Mondays at 6 and 11 p.m., and does not air during the summer months.
 West Michigan Week – a program discussing the week's news headlines, hosted by Patrick Center; it airs Fridays at 9:30 p.m.
 WGVU Newsmakers – a program profiling people and issues, hosted by Patrick Center; it airs Wednesdays at 6:00 p.m.

Specials
 WGVU Community Connection – a monthly program hosted by Shelley Irwin. It spotlights non-profit agencies in West Michigan.
 WGVU Family Health Matters – a program covering health issues.

Documentaries
Notable documentaries produced by WGVU include LZ Michigan (A "Landing Zone" to Remember, Honor, and Celebrate our Community's Veterans and Their Families), Time and Chance: Gerald Ford's Appointment with History, Surviving Auschwitz: Children of the Shoah and Defying Hitler.

Digital television

Digital channels
The stations' digital signals are multiplexed:

WGVU/WGVK's main channel offers programming in 1080i high definition; standard definition programs are shown with pillarboxing. WGVU/WGVK's sixth subchannel offers a scrolling still screen featuring schedule information for the station's five other subchannels, along with background audio and NPR news updates. WGVU-FM is available through the SAP channel on the DT1 channel outside programs carrying Descriptive Video Service audio.

Analog-to-digital conversion
Both stations shut down their analog signals respectively, on June 12, 2009, as part of the federally mandated transition from analog to digital television:
 WGVU-TV shut down its analog signal, over UHF channel 35; the station's digital signal remained on its pre-transition VHF channel 11, using PSIP to display WGVU-TV's virtual channel as 35 on digital television receivers.
 WGVK shut down its analog signal, over UHF channel 52; the station's digital signal remained on its pre-transition VHF channel 5, using PSIP to display WGVK's virtual channel as 52 on digital television receivers, which was among the high band UHF channels (52-69) that were removed from broadcasting use as a result of the transition.

References

External links
Official website
Laker Watchbox
WGVU Online Auction

PBS member stations
Television channels and stations established in 1972
1972 establishments in Michigan
GVU-TV
Grand Valley State University
Allendale, Michigan